Zardak (also known as Zartak) is a village in Saral Rural District, Saral District, Divandarreh County, Kurdistan Province, Iran. At the 2006 census, its population was 55, in 9 families. The village is populated by Kurds.

References 

Towns and villages in Divandarreh County
Kurdish settlements in Kurdistan Province